Naomi Oreskes (born November 25, 1958) is an American historian of science. She became Professor of the History of Science and Affiliated Professor of Earth and Planetary Sciences at Harvard University in 2013, after 15 years as Professor of History and Science Studies at the University of California, San Diego. She has worked on studies of geophysics, environmental issues such as global warming, and the history of science. In 2010, Oreskes co-authored Merchants of Doubt, which identified some parallels between the climate change debate and earlier public controversies, notably the tobacco industry's campaign to obscure the link between smoking and serious disease.

Early life and education
Oreskes is the daughter of Susan Eileen (née Nagin), a teacher, and Irwin Oreskes, a professor of medical laboratory sciences and former dean of the School of Health Sciences at Hunter College in New York. She has three siblings: Michael Oreskes, a journalist; Daniel Oreskes, an actor; and Rebecca Oreskes, a writer and former U.S. Forest Service ranger. She is Jewish.

She received her Bachelor of Science in mining geology from the Royal School of Mines of Imperial College, University of London in 1981. She later received her PhD degree in the Stanford University Graduate Special Program in Geological Research and History of Science.

Career 
She has worked as a consultant for the United States Environmental Protection Agency and US National Academy of Sciences, and has also taught at Dartmouth College, New York University, UCSD and Harvard University. She is the author of or has contributed to a number of essays and technical reports in economic geology and history of science in addition to several books.

Academics 
Oreskes' academic career started in geology, then broadened into history and philosophy of science. Her work was concerned with scientific methods, model validation, consensus, dissent, as in 2 books on the often-misunderstood history of continental drift and plate tectonics. She later focused on climate change science and studied the doubt-creation industry opposing it.

She worked as a mining geologist for WMC (Western Mining Company) in outback South Australia, based in Adelaide.

Starting in 1984, she returned to academe as a research assistant in the Geology Department and as a teaching assistant in the departments of Geology, Philosophy and Applied Earth Sciences at Stanford University.

The 1992 Hitzman-Oreskes-Einaudi paper on Cu-U-Au-REE ("Olympic Dam") deposits has been cited more than 700 times, according to Google Scholar.
She received a National Science Foundation's Young Investigator Award in 1994.

During 1991–1996 she was Assistant Professor of Earth Sciences and Adjunct Asst. Professor of History Dartmouth College, Hanover, New Hampshire. She spent 1996–1998 as Associate Professor, History and Philosophy of Science, Gallatin School of Individualized Study, New York University.

As an example of studying scientific methods, she wrote on model validation in the Earth sciences, cited more than 3200 times according to Google Scholar.

She moved to University of California, San Diego in 1998 as associate professor in the Department of History and Program in Science Studies, then as professor in that department 2005–2013, as well as adjunct professor of Geosciences (since 2007). She was named provost of the Sixth College 2008–2011.

In 1999 she participated as a consultant to the US Nuclear Waste Technical Review Board for developing a repository safety strategy for the Yucca Mountain project, with special attention to model validation.

Since 2013, Oreskes has served as a professor at Harvard University in the Department of the History of Science and Department of Earth and Planetary Sciences (by courtesy).

Since 2017, she has been listed on the board of directors of the National Center for Science Education.

Oreskes is on the board of directors of the Climate Science Legal Defense Fund.

Science and society essay
Oreskes wrote an essay "The Scientific Consensus on Climate Change", published in the science and society section of the journal Science in December 2004.

In the essay she reported an analysis of "928 abstracts, published in refereed scientific journals between 1993 and 2003 and published in the ISI database with the keywords 'global climate change'". The essay stated the analysis was to test the hypothesis that the drafting of reports and statements by societies such as the Intergovernmental Panel on Climate Change, American Association for the Advancement of Science and National Academy of Sciences might downplay legitimate dissenting opinions on anthropogenic climate change. After the analysis, she concluded that 75 percent of the examined abstracts either explicitly or implicitly backed the consensus view, while none directly dissented from it. The essay received a great deal of media attention from around the world and has been cited by many prominent persons such as Al Gore in the movie An Inconvenient Truth.

In 2007, Oreskes expanded her analysis, stating that approximately 20 percent of abstracts explicitly endorsed the consensus on climate change that: "Earth's climate is being affected by human activities". In addition, 55 percent of abstracts "implicitly" endorsed the consensus by engaging in research to characterize the ongoing and/or future impact of climate change (50 percent of abstracts) or to mitigate predicted changes (5 percent). The remaining 25 percent focused on either paleoclimate (10%) or developing measurement techniques (15%); Oreskes did not classify these as taking a position on contemporary global climate change.

Merchants of Doubt

Merchants of Doubt is a 2010 book by Naomi Oreskes and Erik M. Conway. Oreskes and Conway, both American historians of science, identify some remarkable parallels between the climate change debate and earlier controversies over tobacco smoking, acid rain, and the hole in the ozone layer. They argue that spreading doubt and confusion was the basic strategy of those opposing action in each case. In particular, Fred Seitz, Fred Singer, and a few other contrarian scientists joined forces with conservative think tanks and private corporations to challenge the scientific consensus on many contemporary issues.

Most reviewers received it "enthusiastically". One reviewer said that Merchants of Doubt is exhaustively researched and documented and may be one of the most important books of 2010. Another reviewer saw the book as his choice for best science book of the year.

A film with the same name, inspired by the book, was released in 2015.

Other film released in 2020 was The Campaign Against the Climate, a documentary directed by the Danish journalist and filmmaker Mads Ellesøe.

Controversies
Together with Erik Conway and Matthew Shindell, in 2008, Oreskes wrote the paper "From Chicken Little to Dr. Pangloss: William Nierenberg, Global Warming, and the Social Deconstruction of Scientific Knowledge" which argued that William Nierenberg as chairman reframed a National Academy of Sciences committee report on climate change in 1983 into economic terms to avoid action on the topic. Nierenberg died in 2000 but a rebuttal was published in 2010 in the same journal which said the paper contradicted the historical report and there was no evidence that any committee members disagreed with the report; the evidence was that the report reflected the consensus at the time.

In 2015 Oreskes published an opinion piece in The Guardian, titled "There is a New Form of Climate Denialism to Look Out For – So Don't Celebrate Yet", in which she said scientists who call for a continued use of nuclear energy are renewable-energy "deniers" and "myth" makers. She cited an article by four prominent climate scientists (James Hansen, Ken Caldeira, Kerry Emanuel and Tom Wigley) saying nuclear power must be used to combat climate change. An opinion piece by Michael Specter in The New Yorker said she branded these four scientists as "climate deniers", and that her characterization was absurd, as they were among those who had done the most to push people to combat climate change.

In 2015, news outlets described how ExxonMobil scientists had found evidence for climate change but then still persisted to cast doubt about it, a finding Oreskes also reported. The company criticized Oreskes and invited her and the public to read approximately 187 documents written between 1977 and 2014. She and Geoffrey Supran did so and supported the original accounts in the peer-reviewed journal Environmental Research Letters in 2017, as reported by The Washington Post.

Bibliography

Books

Science on a Mission: How Military Funding Shaped What We Do and Don't Know about the Ocean, University of Chicago Press, 2020, 
Why Trust Science?, Princeton University Press, 2019, Edited by Stephen Macedo, 
The Rejection of Continental Drift: Theory and Method in American Earth Science, Oxford University Press, 1999, 
Plate Tectonics: An Insider’s History of the Modern Theory of the Earth, Edited with Homer Le Grand, Westview Press, 2003, 
Perspectives on Geophysics, Special Issue of Studies in History and Philosophy of Modern Physics, 31B, Oreskes, Naomi and James R. Fleming, eds., 2000.
Merchants of Doubt: How a Handful of Scientists Obscured the Truth on Issues from Tobacco Smoke to Global Warming, Naomi Oreskes and Erik M. Conway, Bloomsbury Press, 2010
 The Collapse of Western Civilization: A View from the Future, Naomi Oreskes and Erik M. Conway, Columbia University Press, 2014
 Encyclical on Climate Change and Inequality: On Care for Our Common Home, Pope Francis, introduction by Naomi Oreskes, (Brooklyn, NY: Melville House, 2015) 
 Discerning Experts: The Practices of Scientific Assessment for Environmental Policy. Michael Oppenheimer, N. Oreskes, D. Jamieson, K. Brysse, J. O’Reilly & M. Shindell, University of Chicago Press, 2019, 
 The Big Myth: How American Business Taught Us to Loathe Government and Love the Free Market. Naomi Oreskes and Erik M. Conway. Bloomsbury Publishing, 2023.

Papers 

 
 
 
 
 
 
 
 
 
 
 
 
 
 
 
 
 Cook, J., Supran, G., Lewandowsky, S., Oreskes, N., & Maibach, E., (2019). America Misled: How the fossil fuel industry deliberately misled Americans about climate change Fairfax, VA: George Mason University Center for Climate Change Communication.

Editorials and opinion articles

 Oreskes, Naomi, "Breaking the Techno-Promise:  We do not have enough time for nuclear power to save us from the climate crisis," Scientific American, vol. 326, no. 2 (February 2022), p. 74.
 Oreskes, Naomi, "History Matters to Science: It helps to explain how cynical actors undermine the truth", Scientific American, vol. 323, no. 6 (December 2020), p. 81. "In our 2010 book, Merchants of Doubt, Erik M. Conway and I showed how the same arguments [as those used to cast doubt on the link between tobacco use and lung cancer] were used to delay action on acid rain, the ozone hole and climate change – and this year [2020] we saw the spurious "freedom" argument being used to disparage mask wearing [during the COVID-19 pandemic]."

Selected awards, honors, and fellowships
 The British Academy Medal, 2019
 Mary C. Rabbit Award (History and Philosophy of Geology Division), Geological Society of America, 2019 
 Elected Member of the American Philosophical Society, 2019
 Guggenheim Fellow, 2018-2019, John Simon Guggenheim Memorial Foundation,
 Elected Member of American Academy of Arts and Sciences, 2017
 Plenary Speaker, American Association for the Advancement of Science, 2017
 Stephen H. Schneider Award for Outstanding Climate Science Communication, Climate One, 2016
 Ambassador and Fellow, American Geophysical Union, 2016
 Frederick Anderson Climate Change Award, Center for International Environmental Law, 2016
 Convocation Speaker, The Evergreen State College, Olympia and Tacoma, Washington, 2016
 Public Service Award, Geological Society of America, 2015
 Elected a Fellow of the Committee for Skeptical Inquiry, 2015
 William T. Patten Visiting Lectureship, Indiana University, March 2015
 Herbert Feis Prize for Public History, American Historical Association 2014
 Forum for the History of Science in America Distinguished Lecture History of Science Society 2014
 Presidential Citation for Science and Society American Geophysical Union 2014
 Commencement Speaker University of California, Riverside 2012
 Climate Change Communicator of the Year, George Mason University Center for Climate Change Communication, 2011
 Francis Bacon Award in the History and Philosophy of Science and Technology, Caltech 2008
 Chancellors Associates’ Faculty Excellence Award for Community Service UCSD 2008
 Listed, Who's Who in American Science and Engineering, Who's Who in the West
 George Sarton Award Lecture, American Association for the Advancement of Science, 2004
 American Philosophical Society Sabbatical Fellowship, 2001–2002
 National Science Foundation Young Investigator Award, 1994–1999
 Ritter Memorial Fellowship in History of Marine Sciences, Scripps Institution of Oceanography, 1994
 National Endowment for the Humanities Fellowship for University Teachers, 1993-94
 Society of Economic Geologists Lindgren Prize for outstanding work by a young scientist, 1993

See also

Notes and references

External links

 Oreskes' home page at Harvard University
 
 Why we should believe in science. Lecture in TED-Salon, New York, May 2014.
 The Collapse of Western Civilization. The Science Show, ABC Radio National, 16 August 2014.
 SILA – The Competing Interests Shaping the Future of our Planet. Panel Discussion, American Academy of Arts & Sciences, 18 March 2014. (Transcript.)
 ‘I Can’t Just Stand on the Sidelines’: An Interview with Naomi Oreskes by Claudia Dreifus October 18, 2019
 

1958 births
Living people
20th-century American historians
20th-century American women writers
21st-century American historians
21st-century American women writers
Activists from California
Alumni of Imperial College London
American non-fiction environmental writers
American women historians
Dartmouth College faculty
Harvard University faculty
Historians from New York (state)
Historians of science
Members of the American Philosophical Society
New York University faculty
Place of birth missing (living people)
Scientific American people
Stanford University alumni
Stuyvesant High School alumni
University of California, San Diego faculty
Women earth scientists